Barley wine is a strong ale between 6–12% alcohol by volume.

History

The first beer to be marketed as barley wine was Bass No. 1 Ale, around 1870.

The Anchor Brewing Company introduced the style to the United States in 1976 with its Old Foghorn Barleywine Style Ale. Old Foghorn was styled as barleywine (one word) out of fear that occurrence of the word wine on a beer label would displease regulators. In 1983, Sierra Nevada Brewing released Bigfoot Barleywine, becoming the second barley wine label in the United States.

Characteristics
A barley wine typically reaches an alcohol strength of 6 to 12% by volume and is brewed from specific gravities as high as 1.120; equal to 320g/L of sugars. Use of the word wine is due to its alcoholic strength similar to a wine; but since it is made from grain rather than fruit, it is a beer. Breweries in the United States typically release it once a year during the autumn or winter.

There are two primary styles of barley wine: the American which tends to be hoppier and more bitter, with colours ranging from amber to light brown and the English style which tends to be less bitter and may have little hop flavour, with more variety in colour ranging from red-gold to opaque black. Until the introduction of an amber-coloured barley wine under the name Gold Label by the Sheffield brewery Tennant's in 1951 (later brewed by Whitbread), British barley wines were always dark in colour.

The beer writer Michael Jackson referred to a barley wine by Smithwick's thus: "This is very distinctive, with an earthy hoppiness, a wineyness, lots of fruit and toffee flavours." He also noted that its original gravity is 1.062.

Martyn Cornell was quoted as saying "no historically meaningful difference exists between barley wines and old ales". He later clarified, "I don’t believe there is actually any such meaningful style as 'barley wine'".

Barley wines, such as Thomas Hardy's Ale, are sometimes labelled with a production date, as they are intended to be aged, sometimes extensively.

Taxes and legal impediments 
Many jurisdictions have different taxing schemes for potables based upon alcohol content. Since barley wine has a high alcohol content, it is, in some jurisdictions, taxed at a higher rate than other beers. Thus, barley wines tend to suffer a further price premium compared with other beers. Similarly, many jurisdictions have different regulations regarding where beers and wines can be sold, leading to confusion regarding in which category barley wines fall and therefore limiting access.

Wheat wine 
A variation on the barley wine style involves adding a large quantity of wheat to the mash bill, resulting in what is referred to as wheat wine. This style originated in the United States in the 1980s.

See also
 List of barley-based beverages

References

External links

Beer styles
Beer in England
Barley-based drinks